The Shaikh are a Muslim community found in the state of Uttar Pradesh in India. Word " Shaikh or Sheikh " is an Arabic title of respect dating from pre-Islamic times; it strictly means a venerable member of society or scholar akin to modern day usage of sir or Persian saheb.
They are part of the larger Shaikh community of South Asia. Quite a few Shaikh have immigrated to Pakistan from India, where they form an important element in the Urdu speaking community. Saikhs are not any family, tribes or caste but they are a title adopted to show economic or social development as per Islam in Arab World but they have formed community in South Asia.

History
Shaikh is a word or honorific term in the Arabic language that literally means "elder." It is commonly used to designate an elder of a tribe, a revered wise man, or an Islamic scholar. Some members of Brahmins, Rajputs and Kayastha community also converted to Islam. The Muslim Kayasths, Brahmins and Rajputs use shaikh and khan as their surnames, and consider themselves belonging to the Shaikh community.

Throughout the history of the Delhi Sultanate and its successor the Mughal Empire in South Asia, Muslim technocrats, bureaucrats and traders flocked from the rest of the Muslim world, and the region that now forms Uttar Pradesh was the centre of Islamic power in India. A disproportionately larger number of Indian Muslim converts also acted as rulers, bureaucrats and traders. Over time, the name Shaikh was given to these Muslim families, the vast majority of whom had local origins and many of whom were settled in fortified Muslim settlements, known as Qasbas. They played a key role in the early Islamic history of Uttar Pradesh, serving as courtiers and administrators for the Delhi Sultanate and later Mughal rulers. The archaeogenetics of Shaikhs have shown that they have negligible ancestry from Islamic Central Asia or Middle East. One such community of early Shaikh colonists are the Qidwai, whose ancestor was Qazi Qidwa, a son of the Sultans of Rum, in what is now modern Turkey. The Qazi is said to have been sent to the Awadh region to spread Islam, where he is said to have won over fifty local villages to Islam. These fifty villages were later awarded to him, and the region became known as Qidwara. The converts of these fifty villages were called Qidwai. According to another tradition, Kazi Kidwa is said to have defeated a local ruler in the Awadh region by the name of Raja Jagdeopur. This Raja was said to have belonged to the aboriginal Tribal community. The original settlement of the tribe was Juggaur in Lucknow district, from where they spread to Barabanki District. These early colonists were often required to make converts, and these converts often adopted the clan name of those at whose hand they accepted Islam, and this led to a substantial growth in the Shaikh community.

Present circumstances
Historically, the Sayyid, Siddiqui, Usmani, Abbasi, Hashmi and Farooqui shaikhs of Awadh were substantial landowners, often zamindars, taluqedar and jagirdar. In the urban townships, Shaikh families served as priests, teachers and administrators, with the British colonial authorities given the community a preference in recruitment. Independence in 1947 was traumatic for the community, with many families becoming divided, with some members moved to Pakistan. This was followed by the abolishment of the zamindari system, where land was redistributed to those who till the land.

The Shaikh of Uttar Pradesh are Sunni.  They are fairly widely distributed found in almost all the districts of the state. In the urban areas, Shaikh often live in their own quarters, while they tend to live in their own villages, rarely in multi-clan villages. In western Rohilkhand, particularly in Bijnor and Amroha district where they make a quarter of the population.  Arain community is also descendant of Arab and share significant count in Shaikh community.

As Sayyid, Siddiqui, Usmani, Abbasi, Hashmi and Farooqui communities descend from different individuals belonging from the same tribe Quraish so basically they all belong to Quraish tribe of Arabia. Shaikh's who belong to Haideri, Siddiqui, Usmani, Abbasi, Hashmi and Sayyid but use their surname as Shaikh are also Quraish as they belong to Quraish tribe of Arabia. This Quraishi community use their direct ancestor's name in order to give their exact identity. Throughout history one can find countless examples of these communities intermarrying with each other. There is still a marked preference of marrying with close kin, and they practice both parallel cousin and cross cousin marriages. In their old settlements, often extended families live in close proximity. But as many have begun to migrate to the large urban centres like Delhi or Mumbai, there sense of corporate identity is breaking down, with marriages into the wider Muslim community, with a similar process occurring in Pakistan.

Their primary occupation of the rural Shaikh is still cultivation. The Shaikh cultivate wheat, paddy, maize, sorghum, sugar cane, pulses and vegetables. A few also have mango, guava, and banana orchards. Those of western Uttar Pradesh have benefited from the changes brought about the Green Revolution, while those in the east have seen a decline in their living standards, especially the large taluqdar families.

Manihar

Nagar Muslims

Muslim Kayasths

Milki

References

Social groups of Uttar Pradesh
Muslim communities of Uttar Pradesh
Muhajir communities
Shaikh clans